Halton Region Paramedic Services provides emergency medical services to the municipalities of Halton Region:

 Burlington
 Oakville
 Milton
 Halton Hills

Halton Region Paramedic Services has approximately 280 Paramedics and 15 Paramedic stations throughout The Region. The service began in 2000 and replaced two different contractors to the Ontario Ministry of Health.

Fleet Staffing

 23 Ambulances during the daytime and 14 overnight.
 4 First Response Units during the daytime
 1 Emergency Support Unit, on call

Stations

Oakville, Ontario

1179 Bronte Road (00 Station - Headquarters)
1080 Cornwall Road (12 Station)
139 Georgian Drive (02 Station)
3019 Pine Glen Road (14 Station - Tactical Base)
289 Woodside Dr (15 Station)

Burlington, Ontario
455 Cumberland Avenue (03 Station)
1018 Willowbrook Road (04 Station)
2130 Brant Street (05 Station)
5200 Corporate Drive (10 Station)

Milton, Ontario

2665 Reid Side Road, Campbellville (06 Station)
492 Childs Drive, Milton (07 Station)
7825 Louis St Laurent Ave, Milton (17 Station)
6650 Fifth Line, Milton (16 Station)

Halton Hills, Ontario
53 Maple Avenue, Georgetown, Ontario (13 Station)
39 Churchill Road South, Acton (08 Station)

Special programs

 Honour Guard
 First Response Units
 Tactical Paramedic Team
 Community Paramedics
 Bike Paramedic Team
 Preceptorship (ACP and PCP)
 Prehospital Research / Clinical Trials - PITSTOP (Sepsis), DOSE-VF (Cardiac Arrest)

Regional Bypass Programs:
 STEMI - Trillium Health Partners, Mississauga; Hamilton General Hospital, Hamilton
 Stroke - Trillium Health Partners, Mississauga; Joseph Brant Hospital, Burlington
 Trauma
Adult: 
St. Michael's Hospital, Toronto
Sunnybrook Health Sciences Centre, Toronto
Hamilton General Hospital, Hamilton
 Children:
McMaster Children's Hospital, Hamilton
The Hospital for Sick Children (Sick Kids), Toronto

Historic Emergency Calls in Halton Region involving Halton Paramedics

 February 26, 2012 - Burlington VIA train derailment

See also

Paramedicine in Canada
 List of EMS Services in Ontario
 Paramedics in Canada
 Emergency Medical Services in Canada

Emergency Services in Halton Region
 Halton Regional Police

External links
 OPSEU LOCAL 207
 Halton Region Health Department

Ambulance services in Canada
Regional Municipality of Halton